Stemziel "Stemsy" Hunter is a saxophonist and vocalist. During the 1960s, he was a member of The Electric Flag. He has also played on recordings by Buddy Miles, as well as being a member of Miles's band. Other artists to whose recordings he has contributed are by Crackin' and Gil Scott-Heron. He is also the owner of the Olive Branch Records label, and a record producer.

Background

Hunter ⁠— like Buddy Miles and Herbie Rich ⁠— hails from Omaha, Nebraska.

Career

1960s
As a young man, he was a member of the group led by Andrew Lewis called Andre Lewis & the New Breed.
Hunter, who was a friend of Buddy Miles was brought into the Electric Flag in 1968 when the band were encountering some problems. Members Marcus Doubleday and Peter Strazza were on the verge of getting fired. saxophonist Herbie Rich was doubling on sax and organ as Mike Fonfara who was on organ had just left. Possibly as a result of the drug issues involving some other members of the band, Hunter and Herbie Rich were tied up and robbed by drug dealers and taken Peter Strazza hostage with Buddy Miles and Mike Bloomfield in another room sleeping through the whole event.

While with the band, he played at venues such as the Carousel Ballroom in San Francisco, California.

1970s
During the 1970s Hunter played contributed to recordings by various artists. He played on recordings by the group Maxayn. Along with Maxayn Lewis, Andre Lewis, Marlo Henderson, Emry Thomas and Hank Redd, he co-composed the track "Jam For Jack", which appeared on the 1972 self-titled LP by Maxayn.    In the last quarter of 1973, Hunter joined a group called The Fabulous Rhinestones, which also included Kal David, Marty Grebb, Jack Sarangella and Harvey Brooks.

1980s and 1990s
In 1989, Hunter along with Ken Wright co-produced the On The Rampage album for Guitar Shorty. He was also the credited producer for the "On The Rampage" single. He teamed up with his childhood friends, Buddy Miles, Andre Lewis, Billy Rich, and Marlo Henderson in the group Buddy Miles and the Mighty Rhythm Tribe for the Tribe Vibe album that was released in 1993. He played alto sax on the Red Hot & Blues album by Jimmy "Preacher" Ellis which was released in 1996.

2000s
Since the 2000s, Hunters work has included his solo act which covers styles from R&B and Jazz to some country music. He has also worked on Norwegian Cruise Lines as a performer for at least 7 years.

In 2018, Hunter was playing in a group called Curly Martin & Friends.

Appearances / session work

References

Further reading

External links
 All Music credits

Musicians from Omaha, Nebraska
African-American saxophonists
Record producers from Nebraska
American rock saxophonists
American funk saxophonists
American male saxophonists
American jazz saxophonists
The Electric Flag members
Jazz musicians from Nebraska
American male jazz musicians